The 2018 Darwin Triple Crown (formally known as 2018 CrownBet Darwin Triple Crown) was a motor racing event for the Supercars Championship, held on the weekend of 15-17 June 2018. The event was held at Hidden Valley Raceway near Darwin in the Northern Territory and consisted of two races, 120 and 200 kilometres in length. It was the seventh event of sixteen in the 2018 Supercars Championship and hosted Races 15 and 16 of the season.

Results

Practice

Race 15

Qualifying

Race 

 Notes
 – Richie Stanaway received a 5-second Time Penalty for Careless Driving, causing contact with James Courtney.
 – James Golding received a 15-second Time Penalty for Careless Driving, causing contact with Cameron Waters, which then contacts with Mark Winterbottom.

Championship standings after Race 15 

Drivers Championship

Teams Championship

 Note: Only the top five positions are included for both sets of standings.

Race 16

Qualifying

Top 10 Shootout

Race 

 Notes
 – Todd Hazelwood received a 15-second Time Penalty for exceeding the Pit Lane speed limit at Pit Entry.

Championship standings after Race 16 

Drivers' Championship standings

Teams Championship

 Note: Only the top five positions are included for both sets of standings.

References

Darwin Triple Crown
Darwin Triple Crown
Sport in Darwin, Northern Territory
2010s in the Northern Territory
Motorsport in the Northern Territory